Ceromitia eremarcha is a moth of the  family Adelidae or fairy longhorn moths. It was described by Edward Meyrick in 1931. It is found in Paraguay.

References

Moths described in 1931
Adelidae
Endemic fauna of Paraguay
Moths of South America